

The minute black scavenger flies or "dung midges", are a family, Scatopsidae, of nematoceran flies. Despite being distributed throughout the world, they form a small family with only around 250 described species in 27 genera, although many await description and doubtless even more await discovery. These are generally small, sometimes minute, dark flies (from 0.6 to 5 mm), generally similar to black flies (Simuliidae), but usually lacking the humped thorax characteristic of that family.

The larvae of most species are unknown, but the few that have been studied have a rather flattened shape and are terrestrial and saprophagous.

Scatopsids are a well established group and fossils are known from amber deposits dating back to the Cretaceous period.

Scatopse notata (Linnaeus, 1758) is a cosmopolitan species. Its larval stages are found in decaying plant and animal material.

Genera

 Anapausis Enderlein, 1912
 Apiloscatopse Cook, 1874
 Arthria Kirby, 1837
 Aspistes Meigen, 1818
 Austroclemina
 Borneoscatopse
 Brahemyia Amorim, 2007
 Coboldia Melander, 1916 (sometimes erroneously as Colboldia)
 Colobostema Enderlein, 1926
 Cooka Amorin, 2007
 Diamphidicus Cook, 1971
 Efcookella
 Ectaetia Enderlein, 1912
 Ferneiella Cook, 1974
 Hawomersleya Cook, 1971
 Holoplagia Enderlein, 1912
 † Mesoscatopse
 Neorhegmoclemina
 Parascatopse Cook, 1955
 Parmaferia Cook, 1977
 † Procolobostema
 † Protoscatopse
 Psectrosciara Kieffer, 1911
 Quateiella Cook, 1975
 Reichertella Enderlein, 1912
 Rhegmoclema Enderlein, 1912
 Rhegmoclemina Enderlein, 1936
 Rhexoza Enderlein, 1936
 Scatopse Geoffroy, 1762 (sometimes erroneously as Scatops or Scathops)
 Swammerdamella Enderlein, 1912
 Thripomorpha Enderlein, 1905

Description 

Adult Scatopsidae are 0.6-5.0 mm long. The antennae are relatively short. The wing has strong veins along the anterior margin while the remaining veins are generally weak, and the fork of vein Cu is at the wing base.

The larvae are dorsoventrally flattened with an exerted head capsule, meaning it cannot be retracted. They have a peripneustic respiratory system. Some taxa have spiracles on protuberances.

Life cycle 
Eggs of Scatopsidae are laid on moist substrates in crescent-shaped masses of about 50-300 eggs. Females shortly after laying. The eggs take about 35 days to hatch, though it depends on temperature.

The life cycle take 3-4 weeks to complete in the common species Coboldia fuscipes and S. notata. The adult stage is generally quite short, usually 2-3 or 4-5 days.

Ecology 
Adult Scatopsidae live in various habitats, though they are more frequent and diverse in open, fresh and marshy habitats. Some species are known to feed on flowers, especially Apiaceae.

Larvae live in various kinds of decomposing organic matter. Plant matter is preferred by Scatopsini and Swammerdamellini, with Ectaetia living in rotten wood, Arthria and Rhexoza under bark of decaying trees, and Ectaetia and Holoplagia in tree holes. Various genera are terricolous (living in soil), with Aspistes in sandy soils, Parascatopse in saltings, some Psectrosciarinae and Rhegmoclematini in wet/marshy soils, and Apiloscatopse in forest leaf litter. Fungi are used by Coboldia fuscipes as well as species of Scatopse and Apiloscatopse. Various genera including Scatopse, Coboldia, Cookella and Anapausis live in dung. Animal matter such as carrion is used by Scatopse and Coboldia. A few species of Colobostema and Holoplagia are myrmecophilous (associated with ants), and presumably feed on debris in ant nests. There are even some Scatopsinae which are aquatic, living in forest springs and presumably feeding on waterlogged dead leaves.

Larvae of C. fuscipes and S. notata have also been reported from the waste of canneries and wineries.

Behaviour 
Scatopsidae may form swarms of up to thousands of individuals, sometimes including several species at once, possibly for reproduction. Scatopsidae mate in a tail-tail position and mating can last for a long time. One species, Thripomorpha halterata, has been observed doing rhythmic wing movements while swarming, which may be a courtship behaviour.

Name
The family name Scatopsidae literally translates to "looks like feces" (from Greek skat "dung" and opsi "appearance"). It is derived from the genus Scatopse, which has been frequently misspelled as Scatops.

See also
 List of Australian Scatopsidae

References

  - Family descriptions

Further reading

Species descriptions
 Cook, E.F. (1969). A synopsis of the Scatopsidae of the Palaearctic Part I. Rhegmoclematini. Journal of Natural History 3(3): 393-407  (HTML abstract)
 Cook, E.F. (1972). A synopsis of the Scatopsidae of the Palaearctic Part II. Swammerdamellini. Journal of Natural History 6(6): 625-634. 
 Cook, E.F. (1974). A Synopsis of the Scatopsidae of the palaearctic Part III. The Scatopsini. Journal of Natural History 8(1): 61-100

Fossil record
 de Souza Amorim, D. (1998). Amber Fossil Scatopsidae (Diptera: Psychodomorpha). I. Considerations on Described Taxa, Procolobostema roseni, new species, from Dominican Amber, and the Position of Procolobostema in the Family. American Museum Novitates 3227; 1-17. PDF fulltext

External links
Scatopsidae in Italian
 BioLib: Incomplete taxonomic tree of Scatopsidae
 List of nearctic Scatopsidae species
 Picture of Rhegmoclema hubachecki
 Diptera.info Images
 EOL images

 
Nematocera families
Articles containing video clips